Amma is a 1986 Indian Hindi-language film directed by Jiten and produced by B. B. Katra and Jiten himself, starring Mithun Chakraborty, Vijay Arora, Raakhee, and Ashok Kumar.

Plot
 
Amma is an emotional family film featuring Ashok Kumar and Raakhee in stellar roles.

Summary

Shanta (Rakhi Gulzar) and Prabin (Suresh Oberoi) was married. Nabin (Mithun Chakraborty) is Prabin's younger brother. On the day of marriage, the police raided the house, but did not get Nabin. The reason for Nabin's crime is not disclosed. Then Nabin meets Shanta in the bus, but the police attacks the bus and Nabin escapes again. Meantime, Prabin wins the case of their old ancestral property. Nabin meets family friend Suraj (Vijay Arora) and knows about Shanta's delivery of a boy. Prabin was murdered by his relative and the blame falls on Nabin. However Nabin later proves his innocence in front of everyone. Soon dejected Shanta
with her children and father-in-law had to leave the city. They had a struggled living. Meantime Nabin gets caught by police for the murder of Prabin and sentenced to death. Suraj, who was also Shanta's childhood friend advises Shanta to make pickles and sell it to make money. Shanta follows his advice and starts the pickle factory. Now her father-in-law also passes away. Her son gets married, as well as daughter. Suraj also dies. Now Shanta makes a will and leaves home. Everyone searches for her, but unable to find her. Shanta's grandson Raju finds her in the station. Everyone understand their mistakes and apologises to Shanta. Finally Shanta dies, and her granddaughter Shobha gives birth to a daughter, now everybody believes that their Amma Shanta is born again as
Shobha's granddaughter.

Cast
 
Mithun Chakraborty as Nabin
Raakhee
Ashok Kumar
Urmila Bhatt
Neeta Mehta
Suresh Oberoi
Tom Alter
Bijaya Jena
Bob Christo
Vijay Arora
Shashikala
Manik Irani
Priti Sapru
Khushbu Sundar
Mallika Sarabhai
Paintal
Salim Ghouse
Ramesh Goyal

Songs
"Ek Tha Raaja Ek Thi Raani" - Sushma Shrestha, Anand Kumar C, Hemlata, Viraj Upadhyay
"Mai Hu Teri Amma" - Anand Kumar C, Sulakshana Pandit
"Mai Hu Teri Amma" (part 2) - Sulakshana Pandit
"Rock Rock Baby Masti Me" - Kalyani Mitra, Sushma Shrestha, Amit Kumar
"Taqdeer Se Lad Na Sake Koi" - Anand Kumar C.
"Tumhe Kasam Hai Apni Ma Ki" - Anand Kumar C, Hariharan, Shailendra Singh

References
 
http://www.gomolo.com/amma-movie/5901
https://web.archive.org/web/20110610162713/http://www.jointscene.com/movies/bollywood/Amma%20-%201986/12812

External links

1986 films
1980s Hindi-language films
Indian drama films
Films scored by Raj Kamal